Fairfield County is the name of three counties in the United States:

 Fairfield County, Connecticut 
 Fairfield County, Ohio 
 Fairfield County, South Carolina